A fantasy fiction magazine, or fantasy magazine, is a magazine which publishes primarily fantasy fiction. Not generally included in the category are magazines for children with stories about such characters as Santa Claus. Also not included are adult magazines about sexual fantasy. Many fantasy magazines, in addition to fiction, have other features such as art, cartoons, reviews, or letters from readers. Some fantasy magazines also publish science fiction and horror fiction, so there is not always a clear distinction between a fantasy magazine and a science fiction magazine. For example, Fantastic magazine published almost exclusively science fiction for much of its run.

Major fantasy magazines

Current magazines 
 Abyss & Apex Magazine, 2003–present (US)
 Andromeda Spaceways Inflight Magazine, 2002–present (AUS)
 Apex Magazine, 2005–present (US)
 Aurealis, 1990–present (AUS)
 Bards and Sages Quarterly, 2009–present (US)
 Beneath Ceaseless Skies, 2008–present (US)
 Black Gate, 2001–present (US)
 Clarkesworld Magazine, 2006–present (US webzine)
 Daily Science Fiction, 2010–present (US webzine/email zine)
 Fantastyka, 1982–present, Poland; the oldest SF/fantasy magazine in Eastern Europe, print
 GUD Magazine, 2006–present (US print/pdf)
 Heavy Metal, 1974–present (US)
 Hypnos, 2012–present
Illuminations of the Fantastic, 2020–current (online)
 Lady Churchill's Rosebud Wristlet, 1996–present (US zine)
 Lightspeed, 2006–present (US webzine)
 (Fantasy magazine merged with Lightspeed to become one title in 2012)
 The Magazine of Fantasy & Science Fiction, 1949–present (US)
 Mir Fantastiki, 2003–present (RUS)
  Mithila Review, 2016–present (IND)
 On Spec, 1989–present (CAN)
 Orion's Child Science Fiction & Fantasy Magazine
 Postscripts Magazine, 2004–present (UK)
 Strange Horizons, 2000–present (US webzine)
 Three-lobed Burning Eye, 1999–present (online)
 Tor.com, 2008–present (US webzine)
 Weird Tales, 1923–1954 (US) 
 revivals, including 1986–present

Defunct magazines 
  Absent Willow Review, 2008–2011
 Argosy, 1882–1942, 1942–1978, US
 Beyond Fantasy Fiction, 1953–1955, US
 Electric Velocipede, 2001–2013
 Famous Fantastic Mysteries, 1939–1953, US
 Fantastic, 1952–1980, US (title revived in the 2000s for the former Pirate Writings)
 Fantastic Adventures, 1939–1953, US
 Fantastic Novels, 1940–41, 1948–1951, US
 Fantasy Fiction, 1953, US
 Fantázia, Slovakia
 Fenix, 1990–2001, Poland
 Forgotten Fantasy, 1970–71, US
 Ideomancer, webzine, 2001–2015
 Imagination, 1950–1958, US
 Jim Baen's Universe, 2006–2010, US
 Marion Zimmer Bradley's Fantasy Magazine, 1988–2000, US
 Der Orchideengarten, 1919–1921, Germany
 Paradox Magazine, 2003–?
 Realms of Fantasy, 1994–2010, US
 Science Fantasy, 1950–1967, UK (aka Impulse)
 Shimmer Magazine, 2005–2018
 Subterranean Magazine, print 1995–2007, webzine 2007–2014
 Sybil's Garage, 2003–2010
 The Third Alternative, UK
 The Twilight Zone Magazine, 1981–1987, US
 Unknown, 1939–1943, US
 Whispers, 1973–1987, US

See also
 Fan magazine
 Horror fiction magazine
 Science fiction magazine

References

 
Fiction magazines
Lists of magazines